Lac de la Fauge is a lake at Étival in the Jura department of France. With the nearby Lacs d'Etival, it is part of the preserve "Complexe des bois et du lac de l'Assencière" .

References
   

Fauge